The Type 1 machine gun was developed for aerial use for the Imperial Japanese Army and Navy during World War II. It was an adaptation of the German MG 15 machine gun. (Note that the 12.7mm Ho-103 and H-104 machine guns are also known as the "Type 1 machine gun", but are actually a 12.7mm adaption of the Browning M1919 machine gun in fixed and flexible mountings, respectively.)

Installations
 Aichi B7A
 Mitsubishi Ki-67
 Nakajima C6N
 Yokosuka D4Y

Aircraft guns
World War II weapons of Japan
8 mm machine guns